This list contains  national symbols of the Federative Republic of Brazil.

List of symbols

References

 
Brazil culture-related lists